Tiago Daniel Galante Cruz (born ) is a Portuguese futsal player who plays as a winger for Braga/AAUM and the Portugal national team.

References

External links

Tiago Cruz at playmakerstats.com (formerly thefinalball.com)

1995 births
Living people
Portuguese men's futsal players
People from Vila do Conde
Sportspeople from Porto District